This is a list of notable balloonists:

 Jean-Pierre Blanchard (French) and John Jeffries (American), first flight across the English Channel, 1785.
Mercedes Corominas (1886–1926), first female Spanish balloonist to make a solo ascent, later famed exhibitionist in Portugal and Brazil.
 Alberto Santos-Dumont (1873–1932), Brazilian and one of the very few people to have contributed significantly to the development of both lighter-than-air and heavier-than-air aircraft.
 Steve Fossett (1944–2007), American, first solo non-stop balloon flight around the Earth.
 James Glaisher FRS (1809–1903), English meteorologist, astronomer, and pioneering balloonist, with a world record-breaking ascent in 1862
 David N. Levin (1948–2017), American, only "triple crown pilot"
 J. B. Holmes - (1982), American professional golfer who plays on the PGA Tour. Bronze medal balloonist. 
 Joseph-Michel and Jacques-Étienne Montgolfier, French, inventors of the Montgolfière-style hot air balloon
 Jean Pierre Alfred Nadal, Siege of Paris 1870 French balloon aeronautist, 1871 lieutenant magasinier général des aérostiers civils et militaires
 Letitia Ann Sage (c.1750–1817), first British woman to ascend in a balloon
 James Sadler (balloonist) (1753–1828), first English balloonist
 Élisabeth Thible, first female balloonist
 John Wise (1808–1879?), American
 Roger Wootton (1944–2017), English

References